Wiremu Te Koti Te Rato (1820–1895) was a notable New Zealand  wesleyan minister. Of Māori descent, he identified with the Ngati Kahungunu iwi. He was born in the Wairarapa, New Zealand in  about 1820.

References

1820 births
1895 deaths
New Zealand Methodist ministers
New Zealand Māori religious leaders
Ngāti Kahungunu people